Candaharia rutellum is a species of air-breathing land slug, a terrestrial gastropod mollusk in the family Parmacellidae.

Distribution
The distribution of Candaharia rutellum includes mountains in Central Asia: Tien-Shan, Alai and Pamir-Darvaz.
 Afghanistan
 Pakistan
 Kyrgyzstan
 Tajikistan

Other known areas of distribution include:
 The surroundings of Saint Petersburg, Russia.

The type locality for this species is Kandahar, Afghanistan.

Description

References

Parmacellidae
Gastropods described in 1849
Molluscs of Pakistan